The House of Valois-Burgundy, or the Younger House of Burgundy, was a noble French family deriving from the royal House of Valois. It is distinct from the Capetian House of Burgundy, descendants of King Robert II of France, though both houses stem from the Capetian dynasty. They ruled the Duchy of Burgundy from 1363 to 1482 and later came to rule vast lands including Artois, Flanders, Luxembourg, Hainault, the county palatine of Burgundy (Franche-Comté), and other lands through marriage, forming what is now known as the Burgundian State.

The term "Valois Dukes of Burgundy" is employed to refer to the dynasty which began after King John II of France granted the French Duchy of Burgundy to his youngest son, Philip the Bold in 1363.

During the Hundred Years' War, the dukes rivalled with their royal cousins uniting a great number of French and Imperial fiefs under their rule. However, their plans to establish an autonomous kingdom ultimately failed when the last duke, Charles the Bold, sparked the Burgundian Wars and was killed in the Battle of Nancy in 1477. The final ruler of the dynasty was his daughter, Mary. Her lands outside of France passed to her eldest son, Philip the Handsome, to become the Habsburg Netherlands, while the Duchy of Burgundy itself returned to the kingdom of France. Mary died in 1482, thus ending the House of Valois-Burgundy.

History
The former Frankish Kingdom of Burgundy had been divided into an East and West Frankish part by the 843 Treaty of Verdun. While the eastern part evolved to the Kingdom of Burgundy-Arles that included the Free County of Burgundy and was incorporated into the Holy Roman Empire in 1032, the western Duchy of Burgundy, established about 918 by Richard the Justiciar, became a fief of the French royal House of Capet under King Robert II in 1002. To meet the demands of the Burgundian nobles for autonomy, King Robert installed his second son Henry as Duke of Burgundy about 1016, a title that passed to his younger brother Robert I and his descendants after Henry had succeeded his father as King of France in 1031.

The Capetian House of Burgundy became extinct when Duke Philip I died in 1361, before he was able to consummate the marriage with Margaret of Dampierre, heiress of Count Louis II of Flanders. The Duchy of Burgundy was then unified with the French royal domain under the Valois king John II. Soon after, however, John's fourth son Philip the Bold received the Duchy of Burgundy as an appanage from the hands of his father.

Philip the Bold ruled as Duke Philip II of Burgundy from 1363 to 1404. In 1369 he himself married the widowed Margaret of Dampierre, and when his father-in-law Count Louis II of Flanders died in 1384, he succeeded him not only in the French counties of Flanders, Artois, Rethel, and Nevers, but also in the Free County of Burgundy, becoming a direct vassal of the Holy Roman Emperor. The next year he arranged the double wedding of his son and heir John the Fearless with Margaret of Wittelsbach, daughter of Duke Albert of Bavaria-Straubing and sister of Prince William II of Bavaria, who himself married Philip's daughter Margaret. Already upon the death of King Charles V of France in 1380, Philip together with Duke Louis I of Anjou and Duke John of Berry had acted as regent for his minor son King Charles VI. As Charles VI suffered from increasing mental derangement, Philip tried to spread his influence across the French kingdom, which met with the fierce resistance by the king's younger brother Duke Louis I of Orléans.

Raised in Flanders, Duke John the Fearless succeeded his father in 1404 and unified the heritage of his mother Margaret of Dampierre with the Burgundian duchy. Ceding the French counties of Nevers and Rethel to his younger brothers Philip II and Anthony, he began a skilful see-saw policy to create a scope for free action while the French lands were ravaged by the Hundred Years' War against the Kingdom of England. Like his father he quarrelled with his Valois cousin Louis I of Orléans, whom he had assassinated in 1407. The remaining tensions with the Orléans liensmen led to the French Armagnac–Burgundian Civil War, whereby Duke John allied with King Henry V of England and in 1418 occupied Paris, but was lured into an ambush and murdered by the Armagnac leader Tanneguy du Chastel the next year.

John's son Philip the Good, Duke of Burgundy from 1419, renewed his father's alliance with King Henry V of England when he signed the Treaty of Troyes in 1420 against the French Dauphin Charles VII. He first concentrated on enlarging the Burgundian territories, acquiring the succession in the Imperial County of Namur in 1421 (with effect from 1429) and succeeding his cousin Duke Philip of Saint-Pol in the Imperial duchies of Brabant and Limburg. He also secured the Bavaria-Straubing heritage of his mother Margaret of Wittelsbach and his uncle Duke John III of Bavaria-Straubing, when finally in 1433 the last Straubing heiress Jacqueline ceded the Imperial counties of County of Hainaut (Hennegau), Zeeland, and Holland, as well as Frisia to him. By the 1435 Congress of Arras Duke Philip acknowledged the rule of King Charles VII of France and in turn reached the formal independence of the Burgundian lands from the French Crown. In 1441 he also purchased the Duchy of Luxembourg from the last duchess regnant Elisabeth of Görlitz.

The Valois-Burgundy duke Charles the Bold, ideal picture of a knightly duke, wore himself out in armed conflicts. With the acquisition of Guelders, the Burgundian Netherlands reached their greatest extent. Charles' plans to accomplish the rise of his dynasty peaked in the negotiations with the Habsburg emperor Frederick III about his elevation to a "King of Burgundy" and the marriage of his daughter Mary to Frederick's son Archduke Maximilian of Austria. Enraged at the reluctance of the emperor, Charles started the unsuccessful Siege of Neuss in 1474 and became involved in the Burgundian Wars against the Duchy of Lorraine and the Swiss Confederacy. In consequence, the Valois-Burgundy dukes became extinct in the male line when Charles was killed in the 1477 Battle of Nancy.

The Burgundian heritage passed to the Habsburg archduke Maximilian, who married Mary of Burgundy seven months after her father's death and could ward off the claims raised by King Louis XI of France in the 1479 Battle of Guinegate. The French king could only seize the Duchy of Burgundy proper, Artois, and the former Burgundian fiefs in Picardy. The House of Habsburg abruptly rose to a royal dynasty of European scale, however, at the price of the centuries-long France–Habsburg rivalry.

Dukes of Burgundy (1363–1482)

Coats of Arms

See also
History of Burgundy
Burgundian State
Passport to Pimlico

 
 
Valois-Burgundy
Valois-Burgundy
Valois-Burgundy
Valois-Burgundy
Valois-Burgundy

sl:Burgundsko vojvodstvo